The House of Representatives is the national unicameral legislature of the Republic of Cyprus. Members and three observers representing Armenian, Latin, and Maronite Cypriots are elected by proportional representation every five years. 30% of seats are allocated to Turkish Cypriots, but these have been vacant since 1964. The House of Representatives of Cyprus is the only legislature in Europe within a fully presidential system.

Elections
A general election must be held on the second Sunday of the month immediately preceding the month in which the term of office of the outgoing House expires. The outgoing House continues in office until the newly elected House assumes office, but during this time the outgoing House does not have the power to make any laws or to take any decision on any matter, except in urgent and exceptional unforeseen circumstances.

The House may dissolve itself by its own decision before its term of office expires. When it so decides, it must also specify the date of the general elections which must not be less than 30 or more than 40 days from the date of such decision. In the event of the House dissolving itself it must also specify the date for the first meeting of the newly elected House, which must not be later than fifteen days after the general elections.

Composition

Communities
According to article 62(1) of the Constitution the number of representatives is 50. Out of this number 35 are elected by the Greek Cypriot Community and 15 by the Turkish Cypriot Community.  However, since 1964, Turkish Cypriot members have not attended the House, and no elections have been held among the Turkish Cypriot community in accordance with the Republic's constitution. Despite this anomaly, the House has kept vacant the seats allocated to the Turkish Cypriot community. These seats remain at the disposal of Turkish Cypriot Deputies should they be elected according to the constitutional provisions.

However, for the smooth running of the House of Representatives and of the Committees in particular, the House decided in July 1985 by adopting law 124, to increase the seats to 80. Of these 56 (70%) representatives are elected by the Greek Cypriot Community and 24 (30%) by the Turkish Cypriot Community, as provided in article 62(2) of the Constitution.  The decision was dictated by events because of the broadening of the activities of the House and its participation in many international parliamentary organisations; the number of 50 Representatives was not enough for the unhindered functioning of the legislative body and particularly the functioning of the parliamentary committees.

Seats by District
The current electoral law provides for a simple proportional representation system. The number of seats in each constituency is determined by law with constituencies coinciding with administrative districts. Seat allocation for the Greek Cypriot community are as follows:

History
The first parliamentary elections were held on 31 July 1960 and the elections for the Communal Chambers on 7 August 1960. They were conducted on the basis of the colonial legislation and in accordance with the majority electoral system. The Constitution stipulated that there should be fifty Representatives, thirty-five Greek (70%), elected by the Greek community, and fifteen Turkish (30%), elected by the Turkish community. The smooth functioning of the newly established House of Representatives was however impeded from the very beginning, due to the weaknesses of the Constitution.

The Constitution of the Republic of Cyprus was a given one, worked out by a composite constitutional committee. Though it safeguards the fundamental freedoms and rights of the citizens, at the same time it comprises divisive elements that from the very outset acted as an impediment to the smooth course and development of the State. That happened for the parliament where the constitution provided the requirement for separate majorities of the Greek and Turkish Cypriot Representatives for any amendment of the electoral law and the adoption of legislation pertaining to the municipalities and the imposition of duties or taxes. Thus, a small number of Turkish Cypriot Representatives had the ability to block decisions pertaining to these matters.

In 1961 the Turkish Cypriot Representatives, making use of this right, voted against the bill for the extension of the taxation law and, subsequently, against the Income Tax Bill, leaving the Republic without pertinent income tax legislation for four years.

Following intercommunal violence, which occurred in December 1963, the fifteen Turkish Cypriot Representatives withdrew from the House and their seats remain vacant to this day. All Turkish Cypriots holding state offices or posts in the civil service also withdrew.

In its subsequent terms of office, the House of Representatives assumed the additional task of collaborating with the executive authority, in order to enact special legislation for the equitable distribution of the burdens emanating from the Turkish invasion and occupation, as well as to take other legislative measures aiming at the island’s economic recovery and the relief of the missing persons’ families and those persons displaced or adversely affected. Ever since it is actively involved, both at local and international levels, in the struggle of the people of Cyprus for a just and viable settlement in the Cyprus dispute.

Last election results

Presidents of the House of Representatives
The President of the House is Greek Cypriot and is elected by the Representatives elected by the Greek Cypriot community. The Vice-President is constitutionally provided for to be Turkish Cypriot and is elected by the Representatives of the Turkish Cypriot community. In case of temporary absence of the President or Vice-President of the House, their functions are performed by the eldest Representative of the respective community unless the Representatives of that community decide otherwise. Currently, the President of the House is Annita Demetriou.

The following people have been Presidents of the House
 Glafkos Klerides: August 1960 – July 22, 1976
 Tassos Papadopoulos: July 22, 1976 – September 20, 1976
 Spyros Kyprianou: September 20, 1976 – September 20, 1977
 Alekos Michaelides: September 20, 1977 – June 4, 1981
 Georgios Ladas: June 4, 1981 – December 30, 1985
 Vassos Lyssaridis: December 30, 1985 – May 30, 1991
 Alexis Galanos: May 30, 1991 – June 6, 1996
 Spyros Kyprianou: June 6, 1996 – June 7, 2001
 Dimitris Christofias: June 7, 2001 – February 28, 2008
 Marios Karoyian: March 7, 2008 – June 2, 2011
 Yiannakis Omirou: June 2, 2011 – June 2, 2016
 Demetris Syllouris: June 2, 2016 – October 15, 2020
 Adamos Adamou: October 15, 2020 – June 10, 2021
Annita Demetriou: June 10, 2021 – present

Members
List of members of the parliament of Cyprus, 1981–1985
List of members of the parliament of Cyprus, 1985–1991
List of members of the parliament of Cyprus, 1991–1996
List of members of the parliament of Cyprus, 2001–2006
List of members of the parliament of Cyprus, 2006–2011
List of members of the parliament of Cyprus, 2011–2016
List of members of the parliament of Cyprus, 2016–2021
List of members of the parliament of Cyprus, 2021–2026

See also

Politics of Cyprus
List of legislatures by country

References

External links
 

 
Government of Cyprus
Cyprus
Cyprus
Cyprus
1960 establishments in Cyprus